"I Got That Fire" is song by American hip hop artist Juvenile. It was released in January 2000 as the second single from his 1999 album Tha G-Code. It contains a sample of "Go Go Power Rangers".

Track listing
"I Got That Fire (Radio Edit)"
"I Got That Fire (Extra Clean Radio Edit)"
"I Got That Fire (Instrumental)"
"I Got That Fire (LP Version)"
"I Got That Fire (Call Out Hook)"

Charts

References

1999 songs
2000 singles
Juvenile (rapper) songs
Mannie Fresh songs
Song recordings produced by Mannie Fresh
Cash Money Records singles
Songs written by Juvenile (rapper)
Songs written by Mannie Fresh